See The Theory of Everything (2006 film) for accolades received by the 2006 film.

The Theory of Everything is a 2014 British biographical romantic drama film directed by James Marsh. Anthony McCarten adapted the screenplay from the memoir Travelling to Infinity: My Life with Stephen by Jane Wilde Hawking. The film focuses on Jane's relationship with theoretical physicist Stephen Hawking, his motor neuron disease diagnosis and his career in physics. Actors Felicity Jones and Eddie Redmayne portray the main characters. The Theory of Everything had its world premiere at the 2014 Toronto International Film Festival. It was released in the United Kingdom by Universal Pictures on 1 January 2015. As of February 2015, the film has earned over £50 million in its combined total gross at the box office.

The film gathered various awards and nominations following its release, ranging from recognition of the film itself to Redmayne and Jones' acting performances, McCarten's screenplay and Jóhann Jóhannsson's score. The Theory of Everything earned ten nominations from the 68th British Academy Film Awards, and won three. Redmayne was named Best Actor at the 87th Academy Awards, where the film garnered five nominations. He and Jones received nominations for Best Actor and Actress at the AACTA Awards. Redmayne was also nominated for Best Actor by the Alliance of Women Film Journalists. The film's production designer John Paul Kelly was nominated for an Art Directors Guild Award, while casting director Nina Gold received a nomination for Best Casting in a Studio or Independent Drama from the Casting Society of America and costume designer Steven Noble was nominated for Excellence in Period Film by the Costume Designers Guild. The film gathered five nominations from the Critics' Choice Movie Awards, including Best Picture and Best Screenplay.

At the 72nd Golden Globe Awards, Redmayne won the Best Actor in a Motion Picture Drama accolade and composer Jóhann Jóhannsson won Best Original Score. Redmayne was named Breakout Performance Actor at the 18th Hollywood Film Awards, Best Actor by the New York Film Critics Online and he was awarded the Desert Palm Achievement Award at the Palm Springs International Film Festival. The Motion Picture Sound Editors nominated Glenn Freemantle, Gillian Dodders and Paul Wrightson for Best Dialogue and ADR in a Feature Film. The film's producers Tim Bevan, Eric Fellner, Lisa Bruce and McCarten garnered a nomination for Best Theatrical Motion Picture from the Producers Guild of America.  The Theory of Everything has five nominations from the 19th Satellite Awards, while the cast is nominated for Outstanding Performance by a Cast in a Motion Picture at the Screen Actors Guild Awards. The film's screenplay is nominated for the USC Scripter Award, while the Women Film Critics Circle named Redmayne Best Actor and gave Jones The Invisible Woman Award.

Awards and nominations

References

External links
 

Theory Of Everything